Experience Hendrix: The Best of Jimi Hendrix is a compilation album of songs by American rock musician Jimi Hendrix, released in 1997 by Legacy Recordings. The single compact disc collects 20 songs spanning his career, from his first recordings with the Jimi Hendrix Experience in 1966 to his last with Billy Cox and Mitch Mitchell in 1970.

Experience Hendrix is the first comprehensive collection of Hendrix's songs overseen by Experience Hendrix, a family company that took over management of his recording legacy in 1997. Fifteen songs with the Experience band are included, as well as five with Hendrix's later backing musicians. No songs from the Band of Gypsys lineup with Buddy Miles are included. Experience Hendrix replaces the best-selling 1992 compilation The Ultimate Experience, which features a similar track list but contains fewer songs from posthumous releases.

Reception and charts
In a review for AllMusic, Bruce Eder gave the compilation four out of five stars. He felt that the collection "just misses being the perfect single-CD Jimi Hendrix anthology": while the compilation includes some of Hendrix's noteworthy later work, it lacks several songs from his earlier Smash Hits compilation.

The album reached number 18 on the UK Albums Chart and number 133 on the US Billboard 200. It was ranked number 187 on Nielsen Soundscan's Canadian Top 200 Albums of 2002. In 2006, the Recording Industry Association of America (RIAA) certified it as "2× platinum" for shipping two million copies.

Track listing
The titles and running times are taken from the original Experience Hendrix CD US release.  Other releases may show different information. Entries under "Original release" are for both the US and UK, unless otherwise indicated.

Bonus disc

The album was also released in a two-CD limited edition. The bonus disc contains eight tracks, taken from The Jimi Hendrix Experience box set (2000).

Personnel
Personnel information is taken from the original Experience Hendrix CD US release; other releases may show different information.

Musicians
Jimi Hendrixguitar, vocals; bass on "All Along the Watchtower"; piano and kazoo on "Crosstown Traffic"; glockenspiel on "Little Wing"; bass and harpsichord on "Bold as Love"; piano on "If 6 Was 9", "Freedom"
Mitch Mitchelldrums: all tracks, except "It's Too Bad"
Noel Reddingbass guitar: all tracks, except 5, 12, 16–20, bonus tracks 3, 6; backing vocals on "Purple Haze", "Fire", "Crosstown Traffic"
Billy Coxbass guitar: 16–20 and "Lover Man"
Buddy Milesdrums: "It's Too Bad"
Juma Sultanpercussion on "Freedom", "Dolly Dagger", "Star Spangled Banner"
Jerry Velezpercussion on "Star Spangled Banner"
Larry Leerhythm guitar on "Star Spangled Banner"
The Breakawaysbacking vocals on "Hey Joe"
Dave Masonacoustic guitar on "All Along the Watchtower"; backing vocals on "Crosstown Traffic"
Arthur & Albert Allenbackground vocals on "Freedom", "Dolly Dagger"

Cover image
David Montgomeryphotographer (front cover)

Certifications

References

1997 greatest hits albums
Compilation albums published posthumously
Jimi Hendrix compilation albums
Sony Music Australia compilation albums
Albums produced by Chas Chandler
Albums produced by Jimi Hendrix